The 2022 Fairfield Challenger was a professional tennis tournament played on hard courts. It was the sixth edition of the tournament which was part of the 2022 ATP Challenger Tour. It took place in Fairfield, California, United States between 10 and 16 October 2022.

Singles main-draw entrants

Seeds

 1 Rankings are as of October 3, 2022.

Other entrants
The following players received wildcards into the singles main draw:
  Jacob Fearnley
  Christian Langmo
  Aidan Mayo

The following player received entry into the singles main draw as a special exempt:
  Zachary Svajda

The following player received entry into the singles main draw as an alternate:
  Giovanni Oradini

The following players received entry from the qualifying draw:
  Alafia Ayeni
  Alexander Cozbinov
  August Holmgren
  Alfredo Perez
  Sam Riffice
  Tennys Sandgren

The following player received entry as a lucky loser:
  Malek Jaziri

Champions

Singles

 Michael Mmoh def.  Gabriel Diallo 6–3, 6–2.

Doubles

 Julian Cash /  Henry Patten def.  Anirudh Chandrasekar /  Vijay Sundar Prashanth 6–3, 6–1.

References

2022 ATP Challenger Tour
October 2022 sports events in the United States
2022 in American tennis
2022